The East Texas Bombers is a women's flat track roller derby league based in Lufkin, Texas. Founded in 2005, the league currently consists of a single team which competes against teams from other leagues.

The league was a founding member of the Women's Flat Track Derby Association (WFTDA). However, the Bombers left the organization in mid-2009, becoming only the second league to do so. The league briefly disbanded, but reformed later in the year, with the aim of regaining WFTDA Apprentice membership in 2012.  The league's director described the reformed group as a "brand new team". As of 2016, the league comprised members from Lufkin, Central, Texas, Hudson, Texas, and Huntington, Texas.

WFTDA rankings

References

Roller derby leagues established in 2005
Roller derby leagues in Texas
Sports in Tyler, Texas
Former Women's Flat Track Derby Association leagues
2005 establishments in Texas